Liucheng County is under the administration of Liuzhou, Guangxi Zhuang Autonomous Region, China. Located north of Liuzhou's city proper, it borders the prefecture-level city of Hechi to the west.

Administrative divisions
Liucheng consists of 9 towns, 2 townships and 1 ethnic township:

Towns:
Dapu (大埔镇), Longtou (龙头镇), Taiping (太平镇), Shapu (沙埔镇), Dongquan (东泉镇), Fengshan (凤山镇), Liutang (六塘镇), Chongyao (冲脉镇), Zhailong (寨隆镇)

Townships:
Mashan Township (马山乡), Shechong Township (社冲乡), Guzhai Mulao Ethnic Township (古砦仫佬族乡)

Climate

References

External links
 Official website of Liucheng County

Counties of Guangxi
Liuzhou